The living creatures, living beings, or hayyot (Hebrew חַיּוֹת ḥayyōṯ) are a class of heavenly beings in Jewish mythology. They are described in the prophet Ezekiel's vision of the heavenly chariot in the first and tenth chapters of the Book of Ezekiel. References to the sacred creatures recur in texts of Second Temple Judaism, in rabbinical merkabah ("chariot") literature, in the Book of Revelation in the New Testament, and in the Zohar.

According to Jewish and Christian traditions, there are four living creatures, although their description varies by source. The symbolic depiction of the four living creatures in religious art, especially Christian art, is called a tetramorph.

Ezekiel's four living creatures
Ezekiel's vision of the four living creatures in Ezekiel 1 are identified as cherubim in Ezekiel 10,  who are God's throne bearers. Cherubim as minor guardian deities of temple or palace thresholds are known all over the Ancient East. Each of Ezekiel's cherubim have four faces, that of a man, a lion, an ox, and an eagle. However, the fact that they manifest in human form  sets them apart from the griffin-like cherubs and lamassu of Babylonia and Assyria. Concerning their ability to move, Ezekiel's cherubim do not need to turn, since they face all compass points simultaneously. This description of movement differs from that of the seraphim in Isaiah's vision who have an extra set of wings, giving them the ability to fly.

Revelation's four living beings
In , four living beings (Greek: ζῷον, zōion) are seen in John's vision. These appear as a lion, an ox, a man, and an eagle, much as in Ezekiel but in a different order. They have six wings, whereas Ezekiel's four living creatures are described as only having four. In verse 6, they are said to have "eyes all over, front and back", suggesting that they are alert and knowledgeable, that nothing escapes their notice. The description parallels the wheels that are beside the living creatures in Ezekiel 1.18; 10.12, which are said to be "full of eyes all around". The Hebrew word for "wheel" (ôpannîm) was also used in later Jewish literature to indicate a member of the angelic orders (1 Enoch 71.7; 3 Enoch 1.8; 7.1; 25.5–6, etc.).

Comparing the living creatures in Ezekiel with Revelation's is a prominent apocalyptic study in Western Christianity. An example is the 18th Century works of Jonathan Edwards' recorded interpretation of 1722/23. The four living creatures that John of Patmos sees in the Book of Revelation, is the author's reworking of the living creatures in the visions of Ezekiel and Isaiah.

William D. Mounce noted a belief that the living creatures may have been associated with the four principal (or fixed) signs of the zodiac (Taurus, Leo, Scorpio, and Aquarius), but other scholars have doubted this interpretation.

In a critical analysis of John's vision, April De Conick's 2006 essay outlines that the hayyot in Ezekiel are perhaps not original with the author of Revelation. De Conick suggests that John may have drawn from other merkabah-related texts and by subtly working with images already known to his audience, he reshaped them for his own purposes. With John blending and transforming the images of his sources, it has given way to different interpretations.

Religious views
In Judaism, the living beings are considered angels of fire, who hold up the throne of God. According to the Zohar, they hold up the firmament itself. They are ranked first in Maimonides' Jewish angelic hierarchy. They have also been correlated with four biblical archangels: "Michael is the 'lion-headed', Raphael the "human-headed", Uriel the "bull-headed", and Gabriel the "eagle-headed".

In Christianity, the four living creatures are Cherubim. A prominent early interpretation, variously modified by different interpreters, has been to equate the four creatures with the Four Evangelists. Throughout church history, the most common interpretation (first laid out by Victorinus), but not the original or the only, is that the lion represents Mark, the calf Luke, the man Matthew, and the eagle John. Irenaeus was the first to make the association with the evangelists, but the interpretation laid out by Victorinus and adopted by Jerome, Gregory the Great, and the Book of Kells became dominant. Its influence has been on art and sculpture and is still prevalent in Catholicism  and Anglicanism. A view held by many modern commentators is that the four living creatures of Revelation are agents of God and heavenly representatives of the created order, who call every living thing to worship the Creator.

See also

Quotes

Notes

References

External links

 Jewish Encyclopedia: Angelology

Angels in Christianity
Angels in Judaism
Animals in Christianity
Animals in Judaism
Book of Ezekiel
Book of Revelation
Classes of angels
Cherubim